Blok M MRT Station (or Blok M BCA MRT Station, with BCA granted for naming rights) is a rapid transit station on the North-South Line of the Jakarta MRT in Jakarta, Indonesia. Unlike other stations on the MRT network, it has three tracks, with two island platforms.

Blok M BCA Station has a direct connection to adjacent Plaza Blok M, and will be integrated with Blok M Bus Terminal and Blok M station of TransJakarta nearby. Due to its location at Blok M of Kebayoran Baru, the station is close to shopping centers such as Mal Blok M, Blok M Square and Pasaraya Grande as well as Plaza Blok M itself.

History 

Building plan

Gallery

References

External links 
  Blok M BCA Station on the Jakarta MRT website

South Jakarta
Jakarta MRT stations
Railway stations opened in 2019